A Distant Call is the second studio album by American band Sheer Mag. It was released on August 23, 2019, through Wilsuns Recording Company.

The first single from the album, "Blood From A Stone," was released on June 19, 2019.

Release and promotion

Singles 
Three singles were released on A Distant Call which were released prior to the release of the album. The first single, "Blood From A Stone" was released on June 19, 2019, which coincided with the album's announcement. The second single, "Hardly to Blame", was released on July 22, 2019. The third, and final single from the album, "The Killer", came out on August 19, 2019.

Critical reception

A Distant Call was met with universal acclaim reviews from critics. At Metacritic, which assigns a weighted average rating out of 100 to reviews from mainstream publications, this release received an average score of 81, based on 12 reviews.

Track listing

References

2019 albums
Sheer Mag albums
Albums with cover art by Robert Beatty (artist)